Recess railway station was on the Midland Great Western Railway (MGWR) Clifden branch line from  and was situated in the heart of the Connemara tourism area in Ireland.

History
The station served the town of Recess, County Galway, in the heart of the Connemara tourism area. It was situated on Alexander Nimmo's road serving Galway and Clifden (now part of the N59 route.

The station closed with the line in 1935.

Hotel Platform
In 1903 the hotel lunched Edward VII when he visited by motor car from Leanne, the king being escorted by about one hundred farmers mounted mostly bareback on Connemara ponies wearing Buffalo Bill hats and royal colours. The Hotel platform closed in 1920.

References

Footnotes

Sources
 
 
 
 
 

Disused railway stations in County Galway
Railway stations opened in 1895
Railway stations closed in 1935